Shourya Saini (born 2003) is an Indian deaf sports shooter. He made his Deaflympic debut at the age of 19 representing India at the 2021 Summer Deaflympics.

Career 
He competed at the 2021 Summer Deaflympics and clinched a bronze medal in the men's 10m air rifle shooting event. Interestingly, the event was won by fellow Indian Dhanush Srikanth.

References 

2003 births
Living people
Indian male sport shooters
Deaf sport shooters
Indian deaf people
Deaflympic shooters of India
Deaflympic bronze medalists for India
Medalists at the 2021 Summer Deaflympics
Shooters at the 2021 Summer Deaflympics
21st-century Indian people